Loxostege sierralis is a moth in the family Crambidae. It was described by Eugene G. Munroe in 1976. It is found in North America, where it has been recorded from British Columbia, Saskatchewan, Washington, Utah, Oregon and California.

Subspecies
Loxostege sierralis sierralis (California)
Loxostege sierralis internationalis Munroe, 1976 (southern British Columbia, Washington, northern Oregon)
Loxostege sierralis sanpetealis Munroe, 1976 (Utah)
Loxostege sierralis tularealis Munroe, 1976 (California)

References

Moths described in 1976
Pyraustinae